1,3-Bis(diphenylphosphino)propane (dppp) is an organophosphorus compound with the formula PhP(CH)PPh. The compound is a white solid that is soluble in organic solvents.  It is slightly air-sensitive, degrading in air to the phosphine oxide. It is classified as a diphosphine ligand in coordination chemistry and homogeneous catalysis.

The diphosphine can be prepared by the reaction of lithium diphenylphosphide and 1,3-dichloropropane (Ph = CH):
 2 PhPLi  +  CHCl   →   PhP(CH)PPh  +  2 LiCl

However, it can be synthesised via a much more controllable (and cheaper) route, via metal-halogen exchange and then metathesis:
Br(CH)Br + 2 BuLi → Li(CH)Li + 2 BuBr
Li(CH)Li + 2 PCl → ClP(CH)PCl + 2 LiCl
ClP(CH)PCl + 4 PhLi → PhP(CH)PPh + 4 LiCl

Coordination chemistry and use as co-catalyst
The diphosphine serves as a bidentate ligand forming six-membered CPM chelate ring with a natural bite angle of 91°.  For example, the complex dichloro(1,3-bis(diphenylphosphino)propane)nickel is prepared by combining equimolar portions of the ligand and nickel(II) chloride hexahydrate.  This nickel complex serves as a catalyst for the Kumada coupling reaction. Dppp is also used as a ligand for palladium(II) catalysts to co-polymerize carbon monoxide and ethylene to give polyketones. Dppp can sometimes be used in palladium-catalyzed arylation under Heck reaction conditions to control regioselectivity.

References

Diphosphines
Phenyl compounds